Linda Beverly Clifford is a Canadian former politician, who served in the Legislative Assembly of Saskatchewan from 1975 to 1978. She represented the electoral district of Wilkie as a member of the Saskatchewan Liberal Party caucus.

She later worked on Parliament Hill as an aide to Liberal Party of Canada Members of Parliament,

References

Saskatchewan Liberal Party MLAs
Women MLAs in Saskatchewan
Living people
1949 births